Conflict resolution is the methods and processes involved in facilitating the peaceful ending of social conflict.

Conflict Resolution may also refer to:
 Conflict Resolution (album), a 2008 album by the Passive Aggressives
 "Conflict Resolution" (The Office), an episode of The Office
 Conflict resolution, dealing with multiple editors simultaneously changing the same source document in Revision control

See also 
 Journal of Conflict Resolution